TokuMX is an open-source distribution of MongoDB which, among other functions, replaces the default B-tree data structure found in the basic MongoDB distribution with a fractal tree index. It is a drop-in replacement for MongoDB (applications will run "as is") that offers the scalability and performance improvements associated with fractal tree indexing. It also adds support for document-level locking, transaction support with ACID and MVCC, and replication optimization; it does not support full-text search.

TokuMX is specifically designed for high performance on write-intensive workloads. It achieves this using a fractal tree index,
which replaces 40-year-old B-tree indexing and is based on cache-oblivious algorithms. This approach to building memory-efficient systems was originally jointly developed by researchers at the Massachusetts Institute of Technology,
Rutgers University,
and the State University of New York at Stony Brook (SUNY).
TokuMX is a scalable, ACID, and MVCC compliant distribution of MongoDB that provides indexing-based query improvements, offers online schema modifications, and reduces slave lag for both hard disk drives and flash memory. It also adds transactions with MVCC and ACID reliability to any MongoDB application, making MongoDB suitable for a much wider range of solutions.

Most TokuMX source files are made available under the terms of the GNU Affero General Public License (AGPL). The TokuKV Fractal Tree Indexing library is made available under the terms of the GNU General Public License (GPL) version 2, with an additional grant of a patent license.

B-trees
Most relational databases use indexes to increase query performance. Databases can leverage indexes to significantly reduce the amount of data they examine while responding to queries. Indexes are commonly implemented with B-trees, a data structure first described in 1970. The B-tree data structure allows for operations like inserting data and sorted order iteration, the primary operation used by an index. Depending on the workload and implementation, B-tree performance can be limited by the random I/O characteristics of disks. In addition, while freshly loaded databases tend to have good sequential behavior, this behavior becomes increasingly difficult to maintain as a database grows, resulting in more random I/O and performance challenges.

With the advent of big data and the ever-increasing database needs of the 21st century, many niche databases have been created to get around the limitations of 50-year-old B-tree indexing.  These include some optimized for reads, some optimized for writes, and a series of other special-purpose databases designed for a narrow problem set.

Fractal tree indexes

Overview
Fractal tree indexing technology is a new approach to indexing that replaces B-trees.

Fractal tree indexes implement the same operations as a B-tree, and thus are a drop-in replacement for B-trees.  Fractal tree indexes effectively replaces small, frequent writes with larger, less frequent ones, enabling better compression and insertion performance.
Fractal trees also allow for messages to be injected into the tree in such a fashion that schema changes such as adding or dropping a column, or adding an index can be done online and in the background.
As a result, more indexes can be maintained without a drop in performance. This is because adding data to indexes tends to stress the performance of B-trees, but performs well in fractal tree indexes. Fractal tree index modifications do not cause the database files to fragment, so periodic maintenance to compact files is not needed.

Uses
Fractal tree indexes can be applied to a number of applications characterized by near-real time analysis of streaming data.  They can be used as the storage layer of a database or as the storage layer of a file system. When used in a database, they can be used in any setting where a B-tree is used, with improved performance. Examples include: network event management, online advertising networks, web 2.0 and clickstream analytics, and air traffic control management.
Other uses include accelerated crawler performance for search engines for social media sites. It can also be used to create indexes and columns online, enabling query flexibility for ecommerce personalization. It is also suited to improving performance and reducing existing loads on transactional websites. In general it performs well in applications that must simultaneously store log file data and execute ad hoc queries.

See also

 Database engine
 MongoDB
 TokuDB

References

External links
 TokuMX product page
 TokuMX source code on Github
 Comparison of MySQL Storage Engines
 Bloor Research: Is YourSQL Running too Slowly?
 TokuViewinfo on the official TokuDB blog
 DBMS2.com Overview of Tokutek

Database engines
Free database management systems
NoSQL
Database-related software for Linux
Software using the GNU AGPL license